Khwahan District , is one of the 28 districts of Badakhshan province, located in northeastern Afghanistan. The district capital is Khwahan. The district borders Raghistan to the southwest, Kuf Ab in the northeast, the Panj River in the northwest, and Shuro-obod district, Khatlon province of Tajikistan. Kuh-e kallat

Geography

History
After Alexander the Great overthrew the Persians, the area came under the rule of  the Greco-Bactrian king Euthydemus I and his son Demetrius I

Demography
The population of the district is approximately 27,000. The inhabitants of this area speak Dari Persian and are Sunni Muslims.

Subdivisions
List of villages and places, of Khwahan District in alphabetical order

Economy
The inhabitants of this area engage in agriculture. They grow Buckwheat, red and white barley, sesame, zucchini, corn, mung beans, peas, beans, potatoes.

See also
Darwaz

References

External links
 Map at the Afghanistan Information Management Services
 Its coordinates are 37°53'19" N and 70°13'10" E in DMS (Degrees Minutes Seconds) or 37.8886 and 70.2194 (in decimal degrees). Its UTM position is XG09 and its Joint Operation Graphics reference is NJ42-11khwahan
 

Districts of Badakhshan Province